The Baker Shoal Range Front Light was a lighthouse in Delaware, United States, on the Delaware River at Port Penn.

History
The Baker Range Front Light was discontinued in 1924 and a new steel tower was built. 
The original lighthouse was removed or destroyed and the new tower is an active aid to navigation.

There was a Baker Shoal Range Rear Light that originally served as the Port Penn-Reedy Island Range Light. It became the Baker Shoal Rear Range Light in 1904 when the old range was discontinued due to the C&D channel moving.

See also

 List of lighthouses in Delaware
 List of lighthouses in the United States

References

External links
 Picture of the current Baker Shoal Range Front Light

Lighthouses in New Castle County, Delaware